The 1960 American Football League All-League Team was selected after the 1960 American Football League (AFL) season by three separate entities: current AFL players, the Associated Press (AP), and United Press International (UPI), and was published by The Sporting News. Each selector chose a first-team, and the AFL players and UPI also selected second-teams at some positions.

Teams

References

All-League Players
American Football League All-League players